Exchange students may refer to:
Exchange student, an educational opportunity where a student studies in another country Exchange student
Exchange Students, a Japanese movie Tenkōsei